Virgo Tendencies, Pt. 1 is the first part of two separate extended plays (EP) by American recording artist Keke Palmer. It was released on August 28, 2020 through Palmer's record label Big Bosses Entertainment.

Singles
Sticky was released as the lead single on April 17, 2020.
Thick was released as the second single on July 12, 2020 along with the music video. Snack was released as the third single on July 10, 2020 along with a lyric video. The music video was released on July 16, 2020.
Dreamcatcher was released as the fourth and final single on October 23, 2020 along with a music video.

Promotional Singles
Twerk N Flirt was released as the only promotional single on August 2, 2019. A lyric video was released on August 27 2019.

Track listing
All tracks were produced by A-Lex and Tasha Catour, with Keke Palmer as an executive producer, except where noted. Credits taken from Tidal.

Release history

References

2020 EPs
Keke Palmer albums